Bancyfelin is a village,  west of Carmarthen, Wales. The English translation of the Welsh name is Hill of the Mill. There is no remnant of the mill today.

Up until the 1980s when the A40 dual carriageway bypass opened, the village was plagued by traffic jams in the summer months due to holidaymakers driving to the West Wales coast. The village is located mainly on the old A40 with the exception of the Council Estate built on a nearby hill. The village has gradually expanded with the building of houses on the outskirts.

There is a small primary school, a post office, a pub, a chapel, a garage and Hafod Bakery, a family run bakery which has been baking bread for 60 years.

Werndale Hospital, run by BMI Healthcare, is located at the western end of the village.

People from Bancyfelin
James 'Cubby' Davies – rugby player
Charles Lynn Davies – rugby player
James Ira Thomas Jones – pilot, buried in Sarnau Chapel
Mike Phillips – rugby player
Jonathan Davies – rugby player
Byron Rogers – journalist and author
Delme Thomas – rugby player
Gerald Williams – tennis commentator and journalist

References

Villages in Carmarthenshire